Skenea pelagia is a species of sea snail, a marine gastropod mollusk in the family Skeneidae.

Description

Distribution
This species occurs in the Mediterranean Sea.

References

 Nofroni I. & Valenti G. A., 1987: Skenea pelagia n. sp. Nuovo micromollusco mediterraneo (Prosobranchia); La Conchiglia 19 (216–217): 6–7
 Gofas, S.; Le Renard, J.; Bouchet, P. (2001). Mollusca, in: Costello, M.J. et al. (Ed.) (2001). European register of marine species: a check-list of the marine species in Europe and a bibliography of guides to their identification. Collection Patrimoines Naturels, 50: pp. 180–213

pelagia
Gastropods described in 1987